The 2018 Air Force Falcons football team represented the United States Air Force Academy in the 2018 NCAA Division I FBS football season. The Falcons were led by twelfth-year head coach Troy Calhoun and played their home games at Falcon Stadium in Colorado Springs, Colorado. They were members of the Mountain West Conference in the Mountain Division. They finished the season 5–7, 3–5 in Mountain West play to finish in fourth place in the Mountain Division.

Previous season
The Falcons finished the 2017 season 5–7, 4–4 in Mountain West play to finish in a tie for fourth place in the Mountain Division.

Preseason

Mountain West media days
During the Mountain West media days held July 24–25 at the Cosmopolitan on the Las Vegas Strip, the Falcons were predicted to finish in fifth place in the Mountain Division. They did not have any players selected to the preseason all-Mountain West team.

Media poll

Schedule

Game summaries

Stony Brook

at Florida Atlantic

at Utah State

Nevada

Navy

at San Diego State

at UNLV

Boise State

at Army

New Mexico

at Wyoming

Colorado State

Players drafted into the NFL

References

Air Force
Air Force Falcons football seasons
Air Force Falcons football